Alpen is an unincorporated community in Alberta, Canada. It has an elevation is 2,273 ft.

Localities in Thorhild County